Sorta may refer to:
 Sorta (band), a rock band from Dallas, Texas
 Southwest Ohio Regional Transit Authority (SORTA), public transport agency in Cincinnati, Ohio